Koray Aslan (born 10 October 1983) is a Turkish former football player.

References

İlhan Parlak Gaziantepspor'da!, olaymedya.com, 7 January 2016

External links
 
 
 Profile at futbolig.com.tr 
 

1983 births
Living people
Turkish footballers
Eskişehirspor footballers
People from Bor, Niğde
Association football defenders
Süper Lig players
TFF First League players